Lake Gairdner is a large endorheic salt lake in the Australian state of South Australia, to the north of the Eyre Peninsula. When in flood, the lake is considered the third largest salt lake in Australia.

Description

Lake Gairdner was named by the Governor of South Australia, Richard MacDonnell in October 1857 after Gordon Gairdner, a Chief Clerk of the Australian Department in the Colonial Office.

Lake Gairdner along with Lake Everard and Lake Harris form the extent of the Lake Gairdner National Park. The lakes were all once part of an inland sea that stretched all the way to the Gulf of Carpentaria.

Six ephemeral creeks feed the lake including Garden Well Creek, Gorge Creek and Yeltabinna Creek.

The land occupying the extent of Lake Gairdner  was gazetted as a locality by the Government of South Australia on 26 April 2013  under the name 'Lake Gairdner'.

Salt Lake Racing

It has been a site for various land speed record attempts on its salt flats and is currently the location for the annual Speed Week event run by the Dry Lakes Racers Australia.

See also

 List of lakes of South Australia

References

External links

Endorheic lakes of Australia
Saline lakes of South Australia
Lake Gairdner
Gawler bioregion